The 2012 Montreal Impact season was the club's inaugural season in Major League Soccer, the top flight of both American and Canadian soccer. Including the former club, this was the 19th season of a team under the moniker "Montreal Impact".

For the 2012 season, outside of MLS, the Impact competed in the 2012 Canadian Championship, Canada's domestic cup competition, which determined the Canadian entrant in the CONCACAF Champions League, in which they lost the semi-final.

Jesse Marsch was hired to be the head coach in the club's inaugural season in MLS. Mauro Biello, Preston Burpo and Mike Sorber were hired as assistant coaches for the inaugural season.

Background 

Prior to the start of the season, a Division 2 soccer club of the same named played in the North American Soccer League finishing in seventh during the regular season, failing to qualify for the playoffs.

On May 7, 2010, the club's owner, Joey Saputo, was granted a 19th franchise in Major League Soccer, starting in 2012.  The MLS franchise will be privately owned by the Saputo family.

On June 14, 2011, the Montreal Impact announced they've reached a five-year agreement with the Bank of Montreal (BMO) to become lead sponsor and jersey sponsor when they join MLS as an expansion team in 2012.

Review

October 2011
The building of the Montreal Impact MLS team started on October 3, 2011 with the signing of defensemen Nelson Rivas, who previously played for Inter Milan of the Italian Serie A. The club later awarded MLS contracts to former NASL team defensemen Hassoun Camara, goalkeeper Evan Bush and midfielder Sinisa Ubiparipovic.

November 2011
On November 23, 2011, the league held the 2011 MLS Expansion Draft which allowed the Impact to select ten players from their existing club's unprotected list. Brian Ching (from Houston Dynamo), Zarek Valentin (from C.D. Chivas USA), Justin Mapp (from Philadelphia Union), Bobby Burling (from San Jose Earthquakes), Jeb Brovsky (from Vancouver Whitecaps FC), Collen Warner (from Real Salt Lake), Josh Gardner (from Columbus Crew), Sanna Nyassi (from Colorado Rapids), James Riley (from Seattle Sounders FC) and Seth Sinovic (from Sporting Kansas City) were selected by the Montreal team. James Riley was immediately traded to C.D. Chivas USA with allocation money for Justin Braun and Gerson Mayen. Seth Sinovic was later traded with allocation money to Sporting Kansas City for eventual captain Davy Arnaud. The club continued to build by adding defensemen Tyson Wahl, midfielder Bryan Arguez, and goalkeeper Donovan Ricketts.

December 2011
The club's roster continued to take shape as the club signed Miguel Montaño who had been loaned to their NASL team by the Seattle Sounders FC, veteran goalkeeper and former Impact Greg Sutton, Quebec native midfielder Patrice Bernier and Brazilian midfielder Felipe.

January 2012
The 2012 MLS SuperDraft was held on January 12, 2012. With the first overall pick, the Impact selected Andrew Wenger from Duke University. Defender Calum Mallace was the team's second round choice. The team also added Jamaican defensemen Shavar Thomas to the roster.

February 2012

After a long period of uncertainty regarding his desire to play in Montreal, forward Brian Ching was sent back to Houston Dynamo for a conditional pick in the 2013 MLS SuperDraft. The following day, Impact selected Eddie Johnson via allocation process, but immediately traded him to Seattle Sounders FC for Mike Fucito and Lamar Neagle. After making a good impression in training camp, veteran forward and long time Impact player Eduardo Sebrango was awarded a contract for MLS.

March 2012
On March 1, 2012, Italian defender Matteo Ferrari was signed by the club. On March 10, 2012, the Impact played their first-ever MLS game, a 2–0 loss against the Vancouver Whitecaps FC. A week later, the team made its home debut at the Olympic Stadium, playing to a 1–1 draw with the Chicago Fire; the match attracted 58,912 spectators, surpassing the previous record for professional soccer in Montreal established in a 1981 Montreal Manic home game (58,542). Former Serie A forward Bernardo Corradi was signed by the club on March 15, 2012 after a successful tryout period.

April 2012
The Montreal Impact captured their first ever MLS win on April 7, 2012 against Canadian rival Toronto FC. On April 20, 2012, Mike Fucito was traded to the Portland Timbers for either the Timbers' highest second round pick in the 2013 MLS SuperDraft or a 2013 international roster slot conditional on Fucito's performance.

May 2012
On May 12, 2012, the Impact played in front of a crowd of 60,860 spectators during a game against the Los Angeles Galaxy, establishing a record attendance for a professional soccer match in Canada. On May 24, 2012, Montreal Impact announced the signing of their first-ever Designated Player in Italian striker and Serie A veteran Marco Di Vaio.

June 2012

Quebec defender Karl Ouimette became the first player to graduate from the Montreal Impact Academy when he was awarded a contract on June 5, 2012. June 16, 2012 marked the opening of the fully renovated Saputo Stadium. Impact went on to win 4–1 against the Seattle Sounders FC before 17,112 spectators.

July 2012
In July, the club added two defensemen in Italian international Alessandro Nesta and Swiss Dennis Iapichino. Justin Braun and Tyson Wahl were traded to Real Salt Lake and Colorado Rapids respectively. Bryan Arguez and Miguel Montaño were sent on loans and Bobby Burling, who was selected in the 2011 MLS Expansion Draft but never signed with the team, was traded to C.D. Chivas USA for an international roster slot.

August 2012
On August 7, 2012, Impact swapped goalkeepers with Portland Timbers, sending Donovan Ricketts to Portland for Troy Perkins.

On August 25, the expansion Montreal Impact set the record for most goals scored by an expansion team in MLS in a single season, with their 3–0 win against D.C. United, giving them 42 goals scored, breaking the mark of 40 goals scored by the Portland Timbers in 2011.

Competitions

Pre-season matches

Walt Disney World Pro Soccer Classic

Other pre-season matches

MLS regular season

Table 
Eastern Conference Table

Overall Table

Results summary

Results by round

Match results

Amway Canadian championship 

Semi-finals

Regular Season Friendlies

MLS reserves

The Montreal Impact will compete in the Eastern Division for the 2012 MLS Reserves season. The division consists of seven teams, including Columbus Crew, D.C. United, New England Revolution, New York Red Bulls, Philadelphia Union and Toronto FC.

League table

Match results

Player information

Squad information

Player transactions

In

Out

Loans Out

International Caps
Players called for senior international duty during the 2012 season while under contract with the Montreal Impact.

Management

Statistics

Appearances, minutes played, and goals scored

Goalkeeper stats
{| border="1" cellpadding="4" cellspacing="0" style="margin: 1em 1em 1em 1em 0; background: #f9f9f9; border: 1px #aaa solid; border-collapse: collapse; font-size: 95%; text-align: center;"
|-
| rowspan="2" style="width:1%; text-align:center;"|No.
| rowspan="2" style="width:70px; text-align:center;"|Nat.
| rowspan="2" style="width:44%; text-align:center;"|Player
| colspan="3" style="text-align:center;"|Total
| colspan="3" style="text-align:center;"|Major League Soccer
| colspan="3" style="text-align:center;"|Canadian Championship
|-
|MIN
|GA
|GAA
|MIN
|GA
|GAA
|MIN
|GA
|GAA
|-
| style="text-align: right;" |1
|
| style="text-align: left;" |Troy Perkins
|810
|8
|.89
|810
|8
|0.89
|0
|0
|0.00
|-
| style="text-align: right;" |1
|
| style="text-align: left;" |Donovan Ricketts
|2316
|41
|1.59
|2136
|39
|1.64
|180
|2
|1.00
|-
| style="text-align: right;" |24
|
| style="text-align: left;" |Greg Sutton
|24
|1
|3.75
|24
|1
|3.75
|0
|0
|0.00
|-
| style="text-align: right;" |30
|
| style="text-align: left;" |Evan Bush
|90
|3
|3.00
|90
|3
|3.00
|0
|0
|0.00

Italic: denotes player left the club during the season.

Top scorers

{| class="wikitable sortable alternance"  style="font-size:85%; text-align:center; line-height:14px; width:60%;"
|-
!width=10|No.
!width=10|Nat.
! scope=col style="width:275px;"|Player
!width=10|Pos.
!width=80|MLS
!width=80|CC
!width=80|TOTAL
|-
|8||  || Patrice Bernier                  || MF || 9 ||  || 9
|-
|11||  || Sanna Nyassi                    || MF || 6 || || 6
|-
|9||  || Marco Di Vaio                    || FW || 5 ||  || 5
|-
|7||  || Felipe || MF || 4 ||  || 4
|-
|22||  || Davy Arnaud                     || MF || 4 ||  || 4
|-
|23||  || Bernardo Corradi                || FW || 4 ||  || 4
|-
|33||  || Andrew Wenger                   || FW || 4 ||  || 4
|-
|21||  || Justin Mapp                     || MF || 2 ||  || 2
|-
|25||  || Lamar Neagle                    || MF || 2 || || 2
|-
|28||  || Siniša Ubiparipović             || MF || 2 || || 2
|-
|6||  || Hassoun Camara                   || DF || 1 || || 1
|-
|19||  || Zarek Valentin                  || DF || 1 || || 1
|-
|- class="sortbottom"
| colspan="4"|Totals|| 45 || 0 ||45

Top assists

{| class="wikitable sortable alternance"  style="font-size:85%; text-align:center; line-height:14px; width:60%;"
|-
!width=10|No.
!width=10|Nat.
! scope=col style="width:275px;"|Player
!width=10|Pos.
!width=80|Major League Soccer
!width=80|Canadian Championship
!width=80|TOTAL
|-
|7||  || Felipe || MF || 10 ||  || 10
|-
|8||  || Patrice Bernier                  || MF || 8 ||  || 8
|-
|21||  || Justin Mapp                     || MF || 5 ||  || 5
|-
|9||  || Marco Di Vaio                    || FW || 3 ||  || 3
|-
|11||  || Sanna Nyassi                    || MF || 3 ||  || 3
|-
|22||  || Davy Arnaud                     || MF || 3 ||  || 3
|-
|6||  || Hassoun Camara                   || DF || 2 ||  || 2
|-
|25||  || Lamar Neagle                    || MF || 2 ||  || 2
|-
|2||  || Nelson Rivas                     || DF || 1 ||  || 1
|-
|15||  || Jeb Brovsky                     || DF || 1 ||  || 1
|-
|17||  || Justin Braun       || MF || 1 ||  || 1
|-
|17||  || Dennis Iapichino                || DF || 1 ||  || 1
|-
|18||  || Collen Warner                   || MF || 1 ||  || 1
|-
|19||  || Zarek Valentin                  || DF || 1 || || 1
|-
|23||  || Bernardo Corradi                || FW || 1 ||  || 1
|-
|- class="sortbottom"
| colspan="4"|Totals|| 43 || 0 ||43

Italic: denotes player left the club during the season.

Clean sheets

{| class="wikitable sortable alternance"  style="font-size:85%; text-align:center; line-height:14px; width:60%;"
|-
!width=10|No.
!width=10|Nat.
! scope=col style="width:275px;"|Player
!width=80|Major League Soccer
!width=80|Canadian Championship
!width=80|TOTAL
|-
|1||  || Donovan Ricketts             || 3 || 1 || 4
|-
|1||  || Troy Perkins                     || 2 ||  || 2
|-
|- class="sortbottom"
| colspan="3"|Totals|| 5 || 1 || 6

Italic: denotes player left the club during the season.

Top minutes played

{| class="wikitable sortable alternance"  style="font-size:85%; text-align:center; line-height:14px; width:60%;"
|-
!width=10|No.
!width=10|Nat.
!scope=col style="width:275px;"|Player
!width=10|Pos.
!width=80|Major League Soccer
!width=80|Canadian Championship
!width=80|TOTAL
|-
|22||  || Davy Arnaud                     || MF || 2765 || 180 || 2945
|-
|7||  || |Felipe|| MF || 2456 || 130 || 2782
|-
|18||  || Collen Warner                   || MF || 2431 || 180 || 2521
|-
|15||  || Jeb Brovsky                     || DF || 2233 || 165 || 2398
|-
|1||  || Donovan Ricketts             || GK || 2136 ||  180 || 2316
|-
|8||  || |Patrice Bernier                 || MF || 2194 || 46 || 2240
|-
|13||  || Matteo Ferrari                  || DF || 2029 || 180 || 2209
|-
|11||  || Sanna Nyassi                    || MF || 1716 || 180 || 1896
|-
|21||  || |Justin Mapp                    || MF || 1641 || 44 || 1685
|-
|6||  || |Hassoun Camara                  || DF || 1663 || 15 || 1678
|-

Italic: denotes player left the club during the season.

Disciplinary record
Includes all competitive matches. The list is sorted by position, and then shirt number.

Italic: denotes no longer with club.

Recognition

MLS Player of the Month

MLS Player of the Week

MLS Team of the Week

MLS Save of the Week

MLS Goal of the Week

MLS Coach of the Week

Montreal Impact MVP

Miscellany

Allocation ranking 
Montreal is in the No. 19 position in the MLS Allocation Ranking after using the No. 1 position to select Eddie Johnson. The allocation ranking is the mechanism used to determine which MLS club has first priority to acquire a U.S. National Team player who signs with MLS after playing abroad, or a former MLS player who returns to the league after having gone to a club abroad for a transfer fee. A ranking can be traded, provided that part of the compensation received in return is another club's ranking.

International roster slots 
Montreal has 9 MLS International Roster Slots for use in the 2012 season. Each club in Major League Soccer is allocated 8 international roster spots and Montreal acquired one slot in a trade with Portland Timbers.

Future draft pick trades 
Future picks acquired: *2013 MLS SuperDraft conditional round 2 pick from Portland Timbers; *2013 MLS SuperDraft conditional pick from Houston Dynamo; *2013 Supplemental Draft conditional pick from Columbus Crew; *2014 MLS SuperDraft conditional pick from Real Salt Lake.
Future picks traded: *2015 Supplemental Draft round 4 pick to Portland Timbers.

See also

References 

CF Montréal seasons
Montreal Impact
Montreal Impact
Montreal Impact